Teungku Mohammad Daud Beureueh (17 September 1899 – 10 June 1987) was the military Governor of Aceh (1945–1953) and leader of the Darul Islam rebellion in the province (1953–1963).

Born in the Keumangan chiefdom of Pidie regency, he began from 1930 to champion a more modern form of Islamic school, and became a popular reformist preacher. In 1939 he established and lead the Persatuan Ulama Seluruh Aceh (PUSA), or All Aceh Islamic Scholars Association. PUSA was not initially anti-Dutch, but emerged as the principal critic of the Dutch-supported hierarchy of ulèëbalang (aristocrat-officials). Its members contacted the Japanese before their 1942 invasion, in the hope of overturning ulèëbalang rule as a reward for their support. As the Japanese saw a greater need for popular support in 1944, they transferred many judicial functions from the ulèëbalang to religious courts headed by Daud. After the Japanese surrender this conflict between religious and secular elites became violent, leading to the eclipse of the ulèëbalang and the killing of many in the Cumbok Affair of December 1945/January 1946. Daud was thereafter the most influential figure in Aceh, and his support for the Indonesian Republic's struggle against the returning Dutch helped make Aceh a bastion of the Republican cause. He was recognised as Military Governor in 1947, and Governor once independence was won in 1950.

His consistency towards the enforcement of Islamic law started from the da'wah in his youth, until the beginning of the revolution. On one occasion with Teuku Nyak Arief, he gave the view that Indonesia should be based on Islam. However, Teuku Nyak Arief refused, explaining the diversity that existed in the forerunner of Indonesia. That determination did not subside until President Sukarno met with Tengku Daud Beureueh in his goodwill in June 1948. He advised that after the war of independence Aceh was given the freedom to practice Islamic law, and Sukarno agreed, although his reference to Islamic law was that Aceh was allowed to enact “Islamic family law” and not criminal ones. However, in 1953, Sukarno changed his mind and opposed Aceh's plan to enact Islamic law, stating that "Indonesia is a nation state with the ideology of Pancasila, not a theocratic country with a certain religious orientation" and emphasized that Aceh's plan to enact Islamic laws contradict the secular Indonesian legislature.

He and his supporters were alienated from Jakarta thereafter. Daud was sidelined in favour of western-educated leaders in 1951 when Aceh was merged in a larger Province of North Sumatra with a substantial Christian (Batak) minority. Supported by former PUSA members and much of the military, he led a rebellion against Jakarta in September 1953, declaring that Aceh would join the insurgent Negara Islam Indonesia (Indonesian Islamic State) formed earlier in Java by Kartosuwiryo. Jakarta quickly retook the cities, but resistance was widespread until 1959, when many supporters demanded Aceh to be a "Special Region" with the right to enact Islamic laws. Daud himself did not return from his guerrilla base until 1962, however, when he was given an amnesty but remained very critical.

After the appearance of Free Aceh Movement (GAM) in 1978, Beureueh was arrested and held under house arrest in Jakarta until his death in 1987.

References

Bibliography

 
 
 

1899 births
1987 deaths
Acehnese people
Governors of Aceh
Indonesian military personnel
Indonesian Muslims
Indonesian prisoners and detainees
People from Pidie Jaya Regency
Politics of Aceh
Politicians from Aceh